The Federal Parliamentary Assembly is Ethiopia's federal legislature. It consists of two chambers:

The House of Federation (upper chamber)
The House of Peoples' Representatives (lower chamber)

Created with the adoption of the Ethiopian Constitution of 1995, the Parliament replaced the National Shengo as the legislative branch of the Ethiopian government.

History

Under the 1931 constitution
Imperial Parliament of Ethiopia was first convened by Emperor Haile Selassie in 1931, although it was largely an advisory and feudal body, and was consolidated under the 1931 constitution. The bi-cameral, equal-numbered parliament consisted of the upper Senate (composed largely of nobility, the aristocracy, ministers, Distinguished Veterans and military commanders) and the lower Chamber of Deputies (constituting members chosen by the Emperor, the nobility and the aristocrats).

It was interrupted by the Italian invasion in 1936, and did not meet again until after 1941. By 1955, elders in the districts largely elected the landed aristocrats to the Senate.

Under the 1955 constitution
The 1955 constitution introduced new arrangements to the parliament, including the election of members to the Chamber of Deputies as well as the growth of the lower house to 250 members as opposed to the 125 members of the Senate by 1974. However, deputies largely consisted of feudal lords, rich merchants and high-level members of the civil service. Real power remained in the hands of the Emperor. The parliament would meet in five sessions from 1955 to 1974.

Under the Derg and PDRE
When the monarchy was overthrown, parliament was replaced with a transitional assembly of 60 select members from government institutions and provinces from 1974 to 1975, after which the government largely operated by decree through the military junta headed by Mengistu Haile Mariam. The period without some semblance of a legislature ended in 1987, when the People's Democratic Republic of Ethiopia was established under a new constitution drafted by Mengistu and the Workers' Party of Ethiopia (WPE).

The new Constitution established an 835-member legislature, the National Shengo (National Council), as the highest organ of state power. Its members were elected to five-year terms. Executive power was vested in a president, elected by the Shengo for a five-year term, and a cabinet also appointed by the Shengo. The president was chairman of the Council of State, which acted for the legislature between sessions. Actual power, however, rested in the WPE (and particularly with Mengistu), defined as the leading force of state and society. The National Shengo, while nominally vested with great lawmaking powers, actually did little more than rubber-stamp decisions made by Mengistu and the WPE.

Under the FDRE
Following Mengistu's overthrow in 1991, the Shengo was abolished, and a period of transition lasted until 1995, when a new legislature was inaugurated under the new constitution.

See also
Politics of Ethiopia
List of legislatures by country

References

Further reading
Dagnachew Befekadu and Habtamu Nini Abino, "Presentation on the Parliamentary System of the Federal Democratic Republic of Ethiopia", Association of secretaries General of Parliament website

External links
House of People's Representatives
House of Federation

1995 establishments in Ethiopia
Ethiopia
Government of Ethiopia
Ethiopia
Ethiopia